Saltillo Mansion is a 1943 watercolor painting by the American Realist artist Edward Hopper. The work depicts a Neoclassical, Spanish Revival manse in Saltillo, from the rooftop of his residence. For the summer of 1943, Hopper and his wife resided in Saltillo, first having stationed for a while in Mexico City.

See also
 List of works by Edward Hopper

References

Paintings by Edward Hopper
1943 paintings
Paintings in the collection of the Metropolitan Museum of Art